Regulate... G Funk Era, Part II is the first extended play (EP) by American hip hop recording artist Warren G. The EP was released on 6 August 2015 through G-Funk Entertainment. It is Warren G's first project since 2009's The G Files and serves as a sequel to his 1994 debut. The EP is notable for featuring unreleased vocals of the late Nate Dogg, who was a friend of Warren G.

Commercial performance
The song "Keep On Hustlin", peaking at number 119 in French SNEP chart.

Track listing
All tracks produced by Warren G.

Charts

References

External links
 Official site
 Discogs page

2015 debut EPs
Warren G albums
Hip hop EPs
Albums produced by Warren G
Sequel albums
Gangsta rap EPs